Niels Arden Oplev (born 26 March 1961) is a Danish film director and screenwriter.

Life and career 
Oplev was born in Oue, Denmark. His 1996 film Portland was entered into the 46th Berlin International Film Festival.

He directed The Girl with the Dragon Tattoo, the 2009 Swedish film based on Stieg Larsson's novel of the same title, and won critical acclaim internationally. The film broke box office records in Europe, grossing over 100 million US dollars. Oplev decided to not continue directing the second and third parts of the Millennium Trilogy due to time constraints.

As announced on 30 November 2012, Oplev directed the pilot of a 13-episode mini-series based on the Stephen King novel Under the Dome for CBS.

He directed Dead Man Down, a 2013 film starring Colin Farrell, Noomi Rapace, Dominic Cooper, and Terrence Howard.

He was at one point set to direct The Keep based again on the novel with the same name, and Good People based on the novel by Marcus Sakey.

In 2015, USA Network aired Mr. Robot, and Oplev directed the pilot episode, which went on to win two Emmy nominations.

Filmography

Film

Television

References

External links 
 
 

1961 births
Living people
Danish film directors
Danish male screenwriters
Danish television directors
Filmmakers who won the Best Foreign Language Film BAFTA Award
People from Mariagerfjord Municipality